This is a list of mountain biking areas and trails in Pennsylvania.

Mountain biking areas 
Allegrippis Trails
Blue Marsh
Dick and Nancy Eales Preserve at Moosic Mountain, 14.5 miles of trails.
Galbraith Gap
Hopewell Park
Hubbard Mountain
Lackawanna State Park, 15 miles of trails.
Marsh Creek Park
Merli-Sarnoski Park, 15 miles of trails.
Michaux State Forest
Moon Lake State Forest Recreation Area
Moraine State Park
Nockamixon State Park
North Park
Prompton State Park
Swatara State Park
Trexler Nature Preserve, 18 miles of trails.
Wissahickon Valley Park
Yellow Creek State Park

Lift-serviced bike parks
Lift-serviced bike parks are downhill mountain biking trails—typically open seasonally at ski resorts. Riders are ferried to the top of a mountain by a ski lift. They ride downhill mountain bikes, and usually wear protective armor and a full-facemask bicycle helmet.

List of lift-serviced bike parks 
Blue Mountain Downhill Bike Park (21 trails)
Launch Bike Park
Seven Springs Downhill Bike Park

Rail trails, rails-with-trails, canal towpaths
These types of trails typically feature relatively smooth trail surfaces of crushed rock, dirt, or pavement. They are wide with a gentle grade.

List of trails 
D&L Trail
Black Diamond Trail
Lehigh Gorge Trail
Delaware Canal Towpath
Great Allegheny Passage
Lackawanna Heritage Valley Trail
Pine Creek Rail Trail
Susquehanna Warrior Trail

External links
Pennsylvania riding areas on Trailforks

References

Mountain biking venues in the United States